Rockets Galore! is a 1957 British comedy film directed by Michael Relph and starring Jeannie Carson, Donald Sinden and Roland Culver. The sequel to Whisky Galore!, it was much less successful than its predecessor.

It was based on the novel of the same title by Compton Mackenzie.

In terms of the film's relationship to Whisky Galore, Gordon Jackson, Jean Cadell and Catherine Lacey take their same roles. Ronnie Corbett appears as 'Drooby', with cameo appearances by Richard Dimbleby, Michael Foot and Robert Boothby. It was made at Pinewood Studios with sets designed by the art director Jack Maxsted.

Although not a true sequel to Whisky Galore!, many of that film's locations at Castlebay and on the island of Barra were utilised again and many of the characters returned, but often played by different performers. The film was released in America as Mad Little Island.

Plot
The story is narrated by Finlay Currie.

In the Cold War era of post-Second World War Britain, the government decides to establish a guided missile base in Scotland. The German project leader Dr Hamburger proposes the best location is the Hebridean isle of Todday. The inhabitants are not happy with this disruption of their way of life, and hamper construction as much as they can. An RAF officer (Donald Sinden), sent to negotiate with the people, falls in love with Janet Macleod, the local schoolteacher and realises what the base would mean to the islanders. A delegation of scientists and air force personnel go to make a presentation to the islanders.

When a missile is launched from another Scottish site, the guidance system fails and the missile returns to the land, rather than out at sea. As it is technically on privately owned land, the islanders claim it and celebrate their 'victory' by dancing around the site. The RAF tries unsuccessfully to negotiate, but eventually abandons the base.

As a further impediment to the base the locals 'discover' a rare pink seagull that only nests on Todday (dyed pink by Janet). The government abandon the idea of the base.

Drooby goes to London for a TV programme with Richard Dimbleby to discuss the pink seagulls. A separate TV debate "Free Speech" then debates the issue of national security versus wildlife.

The gulls prove a tourist attraction and the hotel is renamed the Pink Gull Hotel. The next generation of gulls are born pink.

Cast
 Jeannie Carson as Janet Macleod
 Donald Sinden as Hugh Mander
 Roland Culver as Captain Waggett
 Catherine Lacey as Mrs. Waggett
 Noel Purcell as Father James
 Ian Hunter as Air Commodore Watchorn
 Duncan Macrae as Duncan Ban
 Jean Cadell as Mrs. Campbell
 Gordon Jackson as George Campbell
 Alex Mackenzie as Joseph Macleod
 Carl Jaffe as Dr. Hamburger
 Nicholas Phipps as Andrew Wishart
 Jameson Clark as Constable Macrae
 Ronnie Corbett as Drooby
 James Copeland as Kenny McLeod
 John Stevenson Lang as Reverend Angus
 Reginald Beckwith as Mumford
 Arthur Howard as Meeching
 John Laurie as Capt. MacKechnie
 Jack Short as Roderick
 Richard Dimbleby as himself

Critical reception
Howard Thompson of The New York Times wrote of the film: "the general tone is good-natured, the fun is wholesome, if spotty and somewhat forced, and the color photography of the remote little island is altogether lovely. … But it's a far cry from those succinct, Scotch-inspired hiccups that put Todday (actually the Isle of Barra) on the movie map."

References

External links
 

1957 films
1957 romantic comedy films
Barra
Scottish films
English-language Scottish films
Films set in the Outer Hebrides
Films shot at Pinewood Studios
British romantic comedy films
Films set on islands
1950s English-language films
1950s British films